Jemez National Recreation Area is a national recreation area in the U.S. state of New Mexico.  Located in Santa Fe National Forest, the U.S. Forest Service recreation area comprises  and is administered by the U.S. Forest Service's Jemez Ranger District. The Forest Service administers the lands to promote the area for fishing, camping, rock climbing, hunting and hiking. Hunting is specifically permitted in the national recreation area. The government is required to consult with Jemez Pueblo on matters concerning cultural and religious sites and may close areas for traditional uses by the pueblo. Mining is prohibited, except on pre-existing claims.

About  are private lands. The national recreation area borders on Valles Caldera National Preserve. About 1.6 million people visit the area each year.

Jemez National Recreation Area was established in 1993 by Public Law 103-104.

References

National Recreation Areas of the United States
Protected areas of Sandoval County, New Mexico
Protected areas established in 1993
1993 establishments in New Mexico